São João Baptista is a freguesia (civil parish) of Cape Verde. It covers the eastern part of the island of Brava. The parish seat is Nova Sintra. To its west is the parish of Nossa Senhora do Monte.

Subdivisions
The freguesia consists of the following settlements:
 Cachaço
 Cova Rodela
 Furna
 João da Noly
 Lem
 Mato Grande
 Nova Sintra (city)
 Santa Bárbara
 Vinagre

References

Geography of Brava, Cape Verde
Parishes of Cape Verde